The Sunday Show is a British entertainment show that was broadcast on BBC2 from 5 March 1995 to 28 December 1997. Donna McPhail and Katie Puckrik hosted the first two series, Puckrik was replaced by Paul Tonkinson for the third series. For the fourth, Tonkinson hosted with Jenny Ross, previously the show's Pop Desk presenter.

The show is best remembered for giving breaks to two young comedians who went on to greater success: Paul Kaye, who appeared each week in his Dennis Pennis character, attending premieres and other events, and throwing absurd questions at the gathered celebrities; and Peter Kay who presented a regular "World of Entertainment" slot ostensibly reviewing TV and film but, in practice, this was simply a vehicle for his stand-up comedy act.

Other regular contributors included Kevin Eldon in different guises, including 'Guy Boudelaire' and 'Dr Brebner', and Happy Mondays' dancer/mascot/percussionist Bez in a weekly "Science With Bez" slot.

Transmissions

Series

Specials

References

External links

BBC Television shows
1995 British television series debuts
1997 British television series endings
English-language television shows